"God Breathed" is a song by American rapper Kanye West, released on his tenth studio album Donda on August 29, 2021. The song features vocals from American rapper Vory.

Background and recording
The background vocals on the track are solely performed by baritone singer Justin Austin. West had invited the singer to recording sessions for Donda in Mexico, but was unable to make it due to singing Le roi Arthus (King Arthur) at Bard SummerScape, an eight-week opera festival held during the months June to August.  Instead of going to Mexico, they figured out a way to record remotely. For the song, West requested "primitive music" and "Gothic chords" from the singer, which he recalled that he was "shredding my voice, trying to get the right sound". Austin recorded for "a bunch of different songs", with only "God Breathed" being used for the album. Recording engineer Josh Berg recalled that the song originally came out of "thin air", with the song originally just being "hand on the table or his chair and just singing the song", recalling many iterations until the song found its home with the choir. The track title was first revealed on an early track listing posted by West to Twitter on July 21, 2020, as "I Know God Breathed on This".

American rapper Vory, who features on the track, talked about working with West in an interview with XXL. Vory mentioned the faith the rapper has put in him musically, explaining that they are understanding of one another while saying their "vibe is crazy". Vory detailed that even West's childhood friends recognize the vibe, saying of them collaborating, "You would think y'all have known each other for years.". He also stated that West advised him to gain a proper fanbase by putting careful thought into creating a discography, rather than gathering popularity via gimmicks or internet skills, recalling that West said "Bro, it's more powerful that way. You're gaining a real fan base that way". In another interview with GQ, Vory called the relationship mutually beneficial, stating "Ye can understand where I can fix certain things. I can understand where he should take other things". Vory was originally set to feature for five songs on Donda, but when the track listing for the album was being finalized they picked the strongest three as Vory recalled West saying "Wait, man. This is crazy. We got a mini-EP on my album already!". On the album, alongside "God Breathed", Vory features on "No Child Left Behind" and "Jonah".

Composition
The track has been compared to West's 2013 album Yeezus with "chopped up screams", "eardrum-rattling bass", industrial noise, and melancholic gospel vocals throughout the track.

It samples the track "Liquid Liquid" by Bell Head.

Personnel
Credits adapted from Tidal.

 Aaron "Arrow" Sunday - production, songwriter
 E*vax - production, songwriter
 Kanye West - production, songwriter
 Raul Cubina - production, songwriter
 Mark Williams - production, songwriter
 Allday - co-production, songwriter
 Federico Vindver - co-production, songwriter
 Tavoris Javon Hollins - featured vocals, songwriter
 Justin Austin - additional vocals
 Malik Yusef - songwriter
 Dennis Young - songwriter 
 Salvator Principato - songwriter 
 Richard McGuire - songwriter 
 Scott Hartley - songwriter 
 Irko - mixing, mastering
 Mike Dean - mixing
 Stef Moro - mix assistance
 Alejandro Rodriguez-Dawsøn - recording
 Chris Connors - recording
 Enzo Rarri - recording
 Jeff Ryon - recording
 Josh Berg - recording
 Mikalai Skrobat - recording
 Randy Urbanski - recording
 Roark Bailey - recording
 Shane Fitzgibbon - recording
 Chris Connors - vocal editing
 Louis Bell - vocal editing
 Todd Bergman - vocal editing
 Will Heaky - vocal editing

Charts

Notes

References

2021 songs
Kanye West songs
Song recordings produced by Kanye West
Songs written by Kanye West